The following outline is provided as an overview of and topical guide to Austria:

Austria – landlocked sovereign country located in Central Europe.  It borders both Germany and the Czech Republic to the north, Slovakia and Hungary to the east, Slovenia and Italy to the south, and Switzerland and Liechtenstein to the west. The capital is the city of Vienna on the Danube River.

General reference 

 Pronunciation:  or 
 Common English country name: Austria
 Official English country name: The Republic of Austria
 Common endonym(s):  
 Official endonym(s):  
 Adjectival(s): Austrian 
 Demonym(s):
 Etymology: Name of Austria
 ISO country codes: AT, AUT, 040
 ISO region codes: See ISO 3166-2:AT
 Internet country code top-level domain: .at

Geography of Austria 

Geography of Austria
 Austria is a:
 Country
 Developed country
 Landlocked country
 Sovereign state
 Member State of the European Union
 Location:
 Northern Hemisphere and Eastern Hemisphere
 Eurasia
 Europe
 Central Europe
 Western Europe
 Time zone:  Central European Time (UTC+01), Central European Summer Time (UTC+02)
 Extreme points of Austria
 High:  Großglockner 
 Low:  Lake Neusiedl 
Land boundaries:  2,562 km
 784 km
 430 km
 366 km
 362 km
 330 km
 164 km
 91 km
 35 km
Coastline:  none
 Population of Austria: 8,316,487 people (2006 estimate) - 93rd most populous country
 Area of Austria: 83,872 km² (32,383 mi²) - 115th largest country
 Atlas of Austria

Environment of Austria 

Environment of Austria
 Climate of Austria
 Environmental issues in Austria
 Renewable energy in Austria
 Geology of Austria
 Protected areas of Austria
 Biosphere reserves in Austria
 National parks of Austria
 Wildlife of Austria
 Fauna of Austria
 Birds of Austria
 Mammals of Austria

Natural geographic features of Austria 

 Glaciers of Austria
 Lakes of Austria
 Mountains of Austria
 Volcanoes in Austria
 Rivers of Austria
 Waterfalls of Austria
 Valleys of Austria
 List of World Heritage Sites in Austria

Neighbors of Austria 

Austria is bordered by:
 Germany
 Czech Republic
 Slovakia
 Hungary
 Slovenia
 Italy
 Liechtenstein
 Switzerland

Regions of Austria

Administrative divisions of Austria 

Administrative divisions of Austria
 States of Austria
 Districts of Austria
 Municipalities of Austria
 Statutory cities (Statutarstädte)

States of Austria 

States of Austria

 Burgenland
 Carinthia
 Lower Austria
 Upper Austria
 Salzburg
 Styria
 Tyrol
 Vorarlberg
 Vienna

Districts of Austria 

Districts of Austria

The districts of Austria, listed by state:

Districts of Burgenland 

Districts of Burgenland

Districts of Carinthia 

Districts of Carinthia

Districts of Lower Austria 

Districts of Lower Austria

Districts of Upper Austria 

Districts of Upper Austria

Districts of Salzburg 

Districts of Salzburg

Districts of Styria 

Districts of Styria

Districts of Tyrol 

Districts of Tyrol

Districts of Vorarlberg 

Districts of Vorarlberg

Districts of Vienna 

Districts of Vienna

Municipalities of Austria 

Municipalities of Austria
 Cities and towns of Austria
 Capital of Austria: Vienna (outline)

Demography of Austria 

Demographics of Austria

Government and politics of Austria 

Politics of Austria
 Form of government: federal parliamentary representative democratic republic
 Capital of Austria: Vienna
 Elections in Austria
 Political parties in Austria
 Taxation in Austria

Branches of the government of Austria 

Government of Austria

Executive branch of the government of Austria 

Austrian Federal Government

 Head of state: President of Austria, Alexander Van der Bellen.
 Head of government: Chancellor of Austria, Sebastian Kurz.
 Vice-Chancellor of Austria
 Cabinet of Austria

Legislative branch of the government of Austria 

 Parliament of Austria (bicameral)
 Upper house: National Council of Austria (Nationalrat)
 Lower house: Federal Council of Austria (Bundesrat)

Judicial branch of the government of Austria 

Courts in Austria
 Constitutional Court of Austria
 Administrative Court of Austria
 Criminal court system of Austria
 Civil court system of Austria

Foreign relations of Austria 

Foreign relations of Austria
 Diplomatic missions in Austria
 Diplomatic missions of Austria

International organization membership 

International organization membership of Austria
The Republic of Austria is a member of:

African Development Bank Group (AfDB) (nonregional member)
Asian Development Bank (ADB) (nonregional member)
Australia Group
Bank for International Settlements (BIS)
Black Sea Economic Cooperation Zone (BSEC) (observer)
Central European Initiative (CEI)
Confederation of European Paper Industries (CEPI)
Council of Europe (CE)
Economic and Monetary Union (EMU)
Euro-Atlantic Partnership Council (EAPC)
European Bank for Reconstruction and Development (EBRD)
European Investment Bank (EIB)
European Organization for Nuclear Research (CERN)
European Space Agency (ESA)
European Union (EU)
Food and Agriculture Organization (FAO)
Group of 9 (G9)
Inter-American Development Bank (IADB)
International Atomic Energy Agency (IAEA)
International Bank for Reconstruction and Development (IBRD)
International Chamber of Commerce (ICC)
International Civil Aviation Organization (ICAO)
International Criminal Court (ICCt)
International Criminal Police Organization (Interpol)
International Development Association (IDA)
International Energy Agency (IEA)
International Federation of Red Cross and Red Crescent Societies (IFRCS)
International Finance Corporation (IFC)
International Fund for Agricultural Development (IFAD)
International Labour Organization (ILO)
International Maritime Organization (IMO)
International Monetary Fund (IMF)
International Olympic Committee (IOC)
International Organization for Migration (IOM)
International Organization for Standardization (ISO)
International Red Cross and Red Crescent Movement (ICRM)
International Telecommunication Union (ITU)
International Telecommunications Satellite Organization (ITSO)

International Trade Union Confederation (ITUC)
Inter-Parliamentary Union (IPU)
Multilateral Investment Guarantee Agency (MIGA)
Nonaligned Movement (NAM) (guest)
Nuclear Energy Agency (NEA)
Nuclear Suppliers Group (NSG)
Organisation internationale de la Francophonie (OIF) (observer)
Organisation for Economic Co-operation and Development (OECD)
Organization for Security and Cooperation in Europe (OSCE)
Organisation for the Prohibition of Chemical Weapons (OPCW)
Organization of American States (OAS) (observer)
Paris Club
Partnership for Peace (PFP)
Permanent Court of Arbitration (PCA)
Schengen Convention
Southeast European Cooperative Initiative (SECI) (observer)
United Nations (UN)
United Nations Conference on Trade and Development (UNCTAD)
United Nations Educational, Scientific, and Cultural Organization (UNESCO)
United Nations High Commissioner for Refugees (UNHCR)
United Nations Industrial Development Organization (UNIDO)
United Nations Mission for the Referendum in Western Sahara (MINURSO)
United Nations Observer Mission in Georgia (UNOMIG)
United Nations Peacekeeping Force in Cyprus (UNFICYP)
United Nations Truce Supervision Organization (UNTSO)
Universal Postal Union (UPU)
Western European Union (WEU) (observer)
World Confederation of Labour (WCL)
World Customs Organization (WCO)
World Federation of Trade Unions (WFTU)
World Health Organization (WHO)
World Intellectual Property Organization (WIPO)
World Meteorological Organization (WMO)
World Tourism Organization (UNWTO)
World Trade Organization (WTO)
World Veterans Federation
Zangger Committee (ZC)

Law and order in Austria 

Law of Austria
 Animal rights in Austria
Animal welfare and rights in Austria
 Capital punishment in Austria
 Constitution of Austria
Federal Constitutional Law (Austrian act)
 Crime in Austria
Corruption in Austria
Human trafficking in Austria
 Human rights in Austria
Abortion in Austria
LGBT rights in Austria
Freedom of religion in Austria
 Law enforcement in Austria
Federal Police (Austria)
Financial Guard (Austria)
Gendarmerie (Austria)
Municipal police (Austria)

Military of Austria 

Military of Austria
 Command
 Commander-in-chief: President of Austria, Heinz Fischer
 Ministry of Defence of Austria
 Forces
 Army of Austria
 Navy of Austria: None
 Air Force of Austria
 Special forces of Austria
 Military history of Austria
 Military ranks of Austria

Local government in Austria 

Local government in Austria
 Government of Burgenland
 Government of Carinthia
 Government of Lower Austria
 Government of Upper Austria
 Government of Salzburg
 Government of Styria
 Government of Tyrol
 Government of Vorarlberg
 Government of Vienna

History of Austria 

History of Austria
 Timeline of Austrian history
 Current events of Austria
 Military history of Austria
 Rulers of Austria

By state 

 History of Burgenland
 History of Carinthia
 History of Lower Austria
 History of Upper Austria
 History of Salzburg
 History of Styria
 History of Tyrol
 History of Vorarlberg
 History of Vienna

Culture of Austria 

Culture of Austria
 Architecture of Austria
Austrian architects
 Austrophile
 Cuisine of Austria
Austrian wine
Beer in Austria
 Festivals in Austria
 Folk dance
 Languages of Austria
Minority languages of Austria
 Media in Austria
Newspapers
Radio in Austria
Television in Austria
 National symbols of Austria
Coat of arms of Austria
Flag of Austria
National anthem of Austria
Honours system of Austria
 People of Austria
List of Austrians
 Prostitution in Austria
 Public holidays in Austria
 Records of Austria
 Religion in Austria
Buddhism in Austria
Christianity in Austria
Hinduism in Austria
Islam in Austria
Judaism in Austria
Sikhism in Austria
 World Heritage Sites in Austria

Art in Austria 

 Art in Austria
Austrian painters 
 Cinema of Austria
 Literature of Austria
 Music of Austria
Music of Innsbruck
Music of Vienna
Austrian composers
 Theatre in Austria

Sports in Austria 

Sport in Austria
 Basketball in Austria
Austria national basketball team
 Football in Austria
Austria national football team
 Austria at the Olympics
 Motorsport in Austria
 Winter sports in Austria

Economy and infrastructure of Austria 

Economy of Austria
 Economic rank, by nominal GDP (2007): 26th (twenty-sixth)
 Agriculture in Austria
 Banking in Austria
Oesterreichische Nationalbank
Wiener Börse
 Communications in Austria
Internet in Austria
 Companies of Austria
 Currency of Austria: Euro (see also: Euro topics)
Former currency: Austrian schilling
ISO 4217: EUR
 Energy in Austria
Energy policy of Austria
Wind power in Austria
 Health care in Austria
 Mining in Austria
 Tourism in Austria
Visa policy of the Schengen Area
 Transport in Austria
Airports in Austria
Rail transport in Austria
Roads in Austria
Road signs in Austria
Town tramway systems in Austria

Education in Austria 

Education in Austria
 Academic grading in Austria
 Schools in Austria
 Universities in Austria

See also 

Austria

Index of Austria-related articles
List of Austria-related topics
List of international rankings
Member state of the European Union
Member state of the United Nations
Outline of Europe
Outline of geography

References

External links

 aeiou Encyclopedia homepage
 Austria.info Official homepage of the Austrian National Tourist Office
 History of Austria: Primary Documents
 Federal Chancellery of Austria
 Austrian Law Information on Austrian Law
Austria. The World Factbook. Central Intelligence Agency.
 Library of Congress Portals on the World - Austria
 US Department of State Facts and Information (updated February 2005)
 World Intellectual Property Handbook: Austria
 Austria News News from Austria in English language

 Photos
 Europe Pictures - Austria
Photos of Vienna city, the capital of Austria

Austria